The 2020–21 Alaska Anchorage Seawolves men's ice hockey season would have been the 42nd season of play for the program, the 37th at the Division I level and the 28th in the WCHA conference. The Seawolves represent the University of Alaska Anchorage.

Season
In the summer of 2020, the university announced that the men's ice hockey program would be terminated following the 2020–21 season. The move came as a result from many years of poor attendance and the announcement by 7 members of the 10-team WCHA to leave the conference. A year earlier, due to the decline in revenue for the state, there were rumors that the Seawolves would merge their program with the one in Fairbanks, but nothing came to fruition. The end result was that Alaska Anchorage could no longer support several of its programs and, despite once being the cornerstone of the athletic department, the expensive ice hockey team was scheduled for a swan song in 2021.

Before a single game could be played, however, the COVID-19 pandemic made playing the season untenable. In November, Alaska Anchorage suspended all of its indoor sports due to the increased likelihood of spreading the virus. The cancellation effectively ended the program, although a group of alumni, boosters and residents had been attempting to put together a large donation to keep the team running for at least two years. By mid-December, more than $1 million had been raised with a goal of securing $1.5 million and an additional $1.5 million in pledges by February 21, however, the team's future was undetermined.

Departures

Recruiting

Roster

As of February 2, 2021.

Standings

Schedule and Results
Season Cancelled

References

Alaska Anchorage Seawolves men's ice hockey seasons
Alaska Anchorage Seawolves
Alaska Anchorage Seawolves
Alaska Anchorage Seawolves
2021 in sports in Alaska
2020 in sports in Alaska